Arthur Egerton Knight (7 September 1887 – 10 March 1956) was an English amateur footballer who played as a left-back for Portsmouth and Corinthians. He played internationally for the England amateur team, also gaining one full cap for the main England national team. He was a gold medalist with Great Britain at the 1912 Summer Olympics.

Club career
A. E. Knight, as he was always referred to in the press, attended the King Edward VI Grammar School and played for Surrey at the age of 17. He joined local club Godalming after leaving school. He began working for an insurance company and, through his job, moved to Portsmouth in 1908, and there Pompey snapped up the left-back, spending a season in the reserves before making his first-team debut in Southern League Division One.

The First World War brought an end to competitive football. Knight was a member of the Territorial Army and volunteered for overseas service in 1914. He was initially sent with the 1/6th (Duke of Connaught's Own) Battalion of the Hampshire Regiment to India. This was followed by service in France, where he was promoted to the rank of captain in 1916 and served with the Border Regiment.

After hostilities ended, Knight captained the Pompey side that won the 1919–20 Southern League championship, and if not for injury he would have led the side in their first Football League fixture.

He left Portsmouth in 1922, after a campaign that saw Portsmouth finish third in the Third Division South. He played out the remainder of his football career with the Corinthians amateur club, who granted him life membership. He was posthumously inducted into the Pompey Hall of Fame in 2015.

International career
Knight earned 30 amateur international caps. He was a member of the English amateur side that won the gold medal in the 1912 Summer Olympics, featuring in all three matches and he could have scored in the semi-finals against Finland from the penalty spot, but he deliberately sent the kick over the bar on instructions from Vivian Woodward, his captain, because of the Corinthian belief that they could not accept the notion that any player would deliberately foul an opponent. He also played for England in the 1920 Summer Olympics. He gained one full England cap, captaining the side against Ireland in a British Home Championship game on 25 October 1919 at Windsor Park, Belfast, which ended in a 1–1 draw. He had also captained England in a Victory International match against Wales on 11 October 1919.

Knight also played county cricket for Hampshire, playing four first-class games over a period of ten years.

Career statistics
Football League

Honours
Portsmouth
Southern League winners, 1919-20
Great Britain
Gold medal, men's football, 1912 Summer Olympics

Notes

References

External links
 Arthur Egerton Knight at 11v11
 
 
 

1887 births
1956 deaths
Military personnel from Surrey
People educated at Royal Grammar School, Guildford
English footballers
English Olympic medallists
England international footballers
England wartime international footballers
England amateur international footballers
Association football fullbacks
Corinthian F.C. players
Portsmouth F.C. players
Southern Football League players
English Football League players
Footballers at the 1912 Summer Olympics
Footballers at the 1920 Summer Olympics
Olympic footballers of Great Britain
Olympic gold medallists for Great Britain
English cricketers
Hampshire cricketers
Olympic medalists in football
Medalists at the 1912 Summer Olympics
British Army personnel of World War I
Border Regiment officers